Huang Long (born 13 January 1981) is a Chinese footballer.

Career statistics

Club

Notes

References

1981 births
Living people
Chinese footballers
Association football midfielders
China League One players
Chinese Super League players
Shenzhen F.C. players
Zhejiang Professional F.C. players
Guangzhou City F.C. players